Waly Dias Salomão (September 3, 1943 – May 5, 2003) was a Brazilian poet. He was born in Jequié, Bahia. He acted on several areas of Brazilian culture as poet, songwriter and writer. His first book was “Me segura qu’eu vou dar um troço” in 1972. His last book “Pescados Vivos” was published after his death in 2004. He wrote successful lyrics for Maria Bethânia, Gal Costa, Gilberto Gil and Caetano Veloso.

External links
[ Waly Salomão]
article on Brazilian poetry / Wally Salomão
biographical information
Waly Salomão
poem "Ars Poética" by Waly Salomão
Comments on Waly Salomão by David Byrne
[ some songs composed by Waly Salomão]

Brazilian male poets
1943 births
2003 deaths
20th-century Brazilian poets
People from Jequié
20th-century Brazilian male writers